Inocybe tahquamenonensis is an inedible species of agaric fungus in the family Inocybaceae. Found in the United States, it was formally described in 1954 by mycologist Daniel E. Stuntz. Its color is dark purplish brown to reddish- or blackish-brown, with reddish-purple flesh. The gills are attached to the stipe and are somewhat distantly spaced. They are initially reddish brown before turning to chocolate brown, sometimes developing whitish edges. The spore print is brown; spores measure 6–8.5 by 5–6 µm. Fruit bodies grow singly, scattered, or in group under deciduous trees.

See also
List of Inocybe species

References

External links

tahquamenonensis
Fungi described in 1954
Fungi of the United States
Inedible fungi
Fungi without expected TNC conservation status